Užupė ('a place across the river', formerly) is a village in Kėdainiai district municipality, in Kaunas County, in central Lithuania. According to the 2011 census, the village has a population of 95 people. It is located 4 km from Surviliškis, by the Liaudė river, inside the Krekenava Regional Park. There are 3 monumental wooden crosses in Užupė.

History
At the 18th century Užupė was a royal village. 9 families lived in Užupė in 1738. During the Soviet era, Užupė was a subsidiary settlement of Švyturys kolkhoz.

At the beginning of the 21st century an ancient ritual of sprinkling each other with water before the Easter in a hope of better harvest was still observed in Užupė.

Demography

References

Villages in Kaunas County
Kėdainiai District Municipality